David Harrington Angus Douglas, 12th Marquess of Queensberry (born 19 December 1929) is an Anglo-Scottish aristocrat and pottery designer. He is the elder son of Francis Douglas, 11th Marquess of Queensberry, and his only son by his second wife, artist Cathleen Sabine Mann (married 1926 – divorced 1946). His maternal grandparents were an interior decorator, Dolly Mann (née Florence Sabine-Pasley) and artist Harrington Mann. He succeeded his father in 1954.

Early life
He was born in London, and was educated at Eton College.

Career
He served in the Royal Horse Guards. In the 1950s he worked in the pottery industry. He was Professor of Ceramics at the Royal College of Art from 1959 to 1983. He belongs to the Crafts Council, was President of the Design and Industries Association from 1976 to 1978, is a Fellow of the Chartered Society of Designers (and recipient of the Minerva Medal, the Society's highest award), and was Senior Fellow of the Royal College of Art from 1990, and Professor of Ceramics there.

Membership of House of Lords
As a consequence of his birth, Queensberry became a member of the House of Lords, the upper house of the Parliament of the United Kingdom. Under the Peerage Act 1963 which came into effect in August that year, all Scottish peers were given seats in the House of Lords as of right. This right was lost under the House of Lords Act 1999 which as from November 1999 reduced the number of hereditary peers with seats in the Lords from several hundred to only ninety-two, most elected from the peers' own ranks.

Views on LGBT issues
As a hereditary peer, Queensberry spoke in the House of Lords during the passage of the Sexual Offences Act 1967, which legalized homosexual acts in England and Wales. In 2016 he drew a contrast between his views on homosexuality and those of his great-grandfather John Douglas, 9th Marquess of Queensberry, well known for his role in the downfall of the Irish author and playwright Oscar Wilde. 
The 12th marquess explained that he had been delighted to associate his family with a liberalising measure because the Queensberry name "had become so associated with the way Oscar Wilde was pilloried in 1895".

Personal life
Queensberry has been married three times: first in 1956 (div 1969) to Ann Jones (the actress Ann Queensberry), by whom he had two daughters; secondly in 1969 (div 1986) to Alexandra "Lexa" Mary Clare Wyndham Sich (daughter of Rev. Guy Wyndham Sich and Jean Denise Theobald), by whom he had three sons (the eldest born during his first marriage) and one daughter; and thirdly in 2000 to Hsueh-Chun Liao (廖雪君), by whom he had a daughter, legitimated by marriage (d. 2018).

Issue:
 Lady Emma Cathleen Douglas (b. 1956) married 1986 Damon Lewis Vincent Heath, and has issue
 (illegitimate) Ambrose Jonathan Carey (b. 1961), see below
 Lady Alice Douglas (b. 1965) married 1stly 1989 (div) Ali Ugan; md 2ndly 1995 (div) Simon Melia, and has surviving issue, a daughter named Hero and a son named Tybalt.
 Sholto Francis Guy Douglas, Viscount Drumlanrig (born 1 June 1967), legitimated by decision of Lord Lyon when his parents married
 Lady Kate Cordelia Sasha Douglas (b. 1969) married 1999 Tom Weisselberg, and has issue
 Lord Milo Luke Dickon Douglas (1975–2009)
 Lord Torquil Oberon Tobias Douglas (b. 1978)
 Lady Beth Shan Ling Douglas (1999–2018), legitimised later in 2000 by her parents' marriage

Queensberry's eldest but illegitimate son, Ambrose Jonathan Carey (b. 1961), is head of a British security and intelligence firm. His half-sister Caroline Carey (b. 1959), an English art student, married the late Salem bin Laden, prior head of the global Bin Laden family corporation. Ambrose Carey has been married since 1995 to Christina Weir, a daughter of the late Sir Michael Scott Weir KCMG (1925–2006) and his first wife, Alison Walker. They have two sons, Angus Carey-Douglas and James Carey-Douglas. As Ambrose is illegitimate, he and his two sons are not in remainder to the Marquessate and subsidiary titles. 

Queensberry has several siblings. By his father's first wife, he has an elder half-sister, Lady Patricia Douglas, whose daughter Countess Emma de Bendern was the first wife of gossip columnist Nigel Dempster. He has a late sister, Lady Jane Cory-Wright (1926–2007), twice married to David Arthur Cory-Wright, of the Cory-Wright baronets. He has a younger half-brother, Lord Gawain Douglas (born 1948), who is married with issue, one son and five daughters.

References

Sources
Memorial Service: Sir Michael Weir, The Times, 22 September 2006.

External links

1929 births
People educated at Eton College
British potters
Chartered designers
Dinnerware designers
Academics of the Royal College of Art
Living people
Royal Horse Guards officers
Marquesses of Queensberry
Queensberry